The University of Batangas (UB), is a private university, basic and higher education institution located in Batangas City, Philippines. Founded in 1946 as Western Philippine College, it is the oldest university and second-oldest educational institution in Batangas.

Established in 1946, the university currently offers pre-elementary, elementary, high school, undergraduate and graduate studies and law. It has five campuses throughout the province and is ISO certified by AJA. It has been awarded by PACUCOA as having the 3rd most accredited programs in the country. The University of Batangas is recognized by CHED as a Center of Excellence in Teacher Education and as a Center of Development in Business Administration. It has also been recognized by PRC as a consistent top performer in engineering education nationwide. UB remains as a partner of DepEd in the training for K12 Teachers in the province of Batangas.

The University of Batangas College of Law is regarded as a top-performing legal education institution in Calabarzon region in terms of the quantity of lawyers it produces. It is also regarded as a premier legal education institution in the entire region.

History

Early years
The University of Batangas was originally established as the Western Philippine College in 1946 by Vicente R. Catapang, Jesus Lorenzo Arguelles, Juan Y. Javier, Roman L. Perez, Francisco G. Perez, and Pablo C. Umali. The first school was located in a small rental home opposite to Batangas Trade School (now Batangas State University).

Education and Liberal Arts were the initial courses offered, both with Mr. Juan Javier serving as the first dean. Deans of Commerce are Pablo C. Umali and Francisco G. Perez, respectively. Additionally, the high school and elementary department were launched, with Mrs. Flordeliza M. Arguelles and Ms. Gliceria Martinez serving as the respective principals. Due to the sudden increase from 48 to 78 students after a year, the classes were transferred to the Javier house, which was located on the corner of D. Silang and P. Burgos streets.

After being chosen by the board of trustees to lead the university, Vicente Catapang served as its first president.

Present years

The Executive Committee, was established by the Board of Trustees to overhaul the management and administration of Western Philippine College. The institution had maintained its ideals of offering a top-notch education to the youth of Batangas and the surrounding areas thanks to the new leadership. Abelardo B. Perez was chosen by the Executive Committee members as President and Chairman after three years. Abelardo Perez was the institution's president when the Board of Trustees' officers made the decision to have it converted to a stock corporation and registered with the Securities and Exchange Commission on December 23, 1967.

The presidency was held by Abelardo Perez until his demise in 2007. His brother, Hernando Perez succeeded him as the university president.

Leadership

Board of Regents
The University of Batangas Board of Regents is the highest governing body of the university.

Executive Committee
The Executive Committee, led by Manuel Panganiban, was established by the Board of Trustees to restructure the management and administration of WPC. The institution had maintained its ideals of offering a top-notch education to the youth of Batangas and the surrounding areas. Abelardo B. Perez was chosen by the Executive Committee members as President and Chairman after three years. The officers of the Board of Trustees made the decision to convert the organization to a stock corporation during the tenure of Perez, and on December 23, 1967, the Securities and Exchange Commission officially registered it as such.

List of Chairperson of the Executive Committee

Campus

As of 2022, the University of Batangas has one main and three satellite campuses in Batangas.

The university has four campuses in the Batangas Province. The Batangas campus, which houses the Colleges, Highschool Department and Administrative offices of the university is located in Hilltop, Batangas City; while the pre-elementary and elementary departments are in the Downtown campus along M.H. del Pilar Street, beside the City Library near the Batangas Basilica. The university's Pallocan East campus is the site of the Waldorf School International, and the newest addition is the Lipa City Campus, which is located in Marawoy, Lipa City, Batangas.

Academics

University of Batangas K to 12 Curriculum

University of Batangas Colleges and Courses

References

External links 

Official Website of the University of Batangas
www.ub.edu.ph/ublc/ublcindex.html
www.ub.edu.ph

Universities and colleges in Batangas
High schools in Batangas
Education in Batangas City
Philippines National Rugby League teams